T-V-H (Thailand-Vietnam-Hong Kong) is a submarine telecommunications cable system in the South China Sea linking Thailand, Vietnam and Hong Kong.

It has landing points in:
Si Racha, Chonburi Province, Thailand
Vũng Tàu, Bà Rịa–Vũng Tàu province, Vietnam
Deep Water Bay, Southern District, Hong Kong

It started operation on 8 February 1996.

Service disruptions
On 25 March 2007, thie cable network was broken due to local "fishermen" who cut the cable to sell for scrap metals. It was estimated that the link would take three months to repair.

Referencces

External links
 

Submarine communications cables in the Pacific Ocean
Thailand–Vietnam relations
China–Thailand relations
China–Vietnam relations
1996 establishments in Hong Kong
1996 establishments in Thailand
1996 establishments in Vietnam